Crostwick Marsh is an  biological Site of Special Scientific Interest in Crostwick, north of Norwich in Norfolk. It is part of the Broadland Ramsar site and Special Protection Area, and The Broads Special Area of Conservation.

This marsh is in the valley of the Crostwick Beck, a tributary of the River Bure. It has areas of damp grassland, tall fen, species-rich fen grassland, alder carr, scrub and dykes. There is a variety of breeding marshland birds.

Pedestrian access by footpath between North Walsham Road and Granny Bard's Lane.

References

Sites of Special Scientific Interest in Norfolk